Girdhari Lal Vyas was an Indian politician.  He was elected to the Lok Sabha, the lower house of the Parliament of India from Bhilwara, Rajasthan as a member of the Indian National Congress.

References

Year of birth missing
India MPs 1952–1957
India MPs 1957–1962
India MPs 1962–1967
Lok Sabha members from Rajasthan
Indian National Congress politicians
Year of death missing